Deng Xiaohua (born May 30, 1953), better known by her pen name Can Xue, is a Chinese avant-garde fiction writer and literary critic. Her family was severely persecuted following her father being labeled a rightist in the Anti-Rightist Campaign of 1957. Her writing, which consists mostly of short fiction, breaks with the realism of earlier modern Chinese writers. She has also written novels, novellas, and literary criticisms of the work of Dante, Jorge Luis Borges, and Franz Kafka. Can Xue has been described as "China’s most prominent author of experimental fiction", and some of her fiction has been translated and published in English.

Life 
Deng Xiaohua was born in 1953, in Changsha, Hunan, China. Her early life was marked by a series of tragic hardships which influenced the direction of her work. She was one of six children born to a man who was once the editor-in-chief of the New Hunan Daily. Her parents, like many intellectuals at the time, were denounced as rightists in the Anti-Rightist Campaign of 1957, despite being communist Party members themselves. Her father was sent to the countryside for two years in retribution for allegedly leading an anti-Communist Party group at the paper. Two years later, the entire family was evicted from the company housing at the newspaper and moved to a tiny hut below the Yuelu Mountain, on the rural outskirts of Changsha. In the years that followed, the family suffered greatly under further persecution. Her father was jailed, and her mother was sent along with her two brothers to the countryside for re-education through labor. Deng was allowed to remain in the city because of her poor health. After being forced to leave the small hut, she lived alone in a small, dark room under a staircase. By the time of the Cultural Revolution, Deng was thirteen years old. Her formal education was permanently disrupted after completing primary school.

Can Xue describes the horrors of her youth in detail in her memoirs titled "A Summer Day in the Beautiful South" which is included as the foreword to her short story collection Dialogues in Paradise. Throughout this period, her entire family “struggled along on the verge of death.” Her grandmother, who raised her while her parents were gone, soon succumbed to hunger and fatigue, dying with severe edema, a grotesque swelling condition. While the family was forced to scavenge food, eventually eating all of the wool clothes in the house, Can Xue contracted a severe case of tuberculosis.

Later, she was able to find work as a metalworker. Ten years later, in 1980, after giving birth to her first son, she quit work at the factory. She and her husband then started a small tailoring business at home after teaching themselves to sew.

She began writing in 1983, and published her first short story Soap Bubbles in Dirty Water (污水上的肥皂泡) in January 1985 and then two other short stories, The Bull (公牛) and The Hut on the Hill (山上的小屋) in 1985, at which point she chose the pen name Can Xue. This pen name can be interpreted either as the stubborn, dirty snow left at the end of winter or the remaining snow at the peak of a mountain after the rest has melted. Publishing under a pen name allowed Can Xue to write without revealing her gender. According to Tonglin Lu (a Professor of Comparative Literature at the University of Montreal) once critics found out she was a woman, her “subversive voice within the supposedly subversive order [of avant-garde fiction]” made them uncomfortable. (Tonglin Lu coined this "double subversion.") Not only was she writing avant-garde fiction, but she was also a woman—so male writers and critics attempted to analyze her works by psychoanalysis of the author, and some even went so far as to suggest she was certifiably insane.  In 2002, she said, "Lots of [the critics] hate me, or at least they just keep silent, hoping I'll disappear. No one discusses my works, either because they disagree or don't understand.”

More recently, however, many critics have paid tribute to her work, drawn to the careful precision she uses to create such a strange, unsettling effect on the reader.

Work 
Can Xue's abstract style and unconventional narrative form attracted a lot of attention from critics in the 1990s. A variety of interpretations of her work have been published, but political allegory has been the most popular way of understanding her early short stories. Many of the images in her stories have been linked to the Cultural Revolution, the Anti-rightist Movement and other turbulent political movements of the early People's Republic of China. However, direct references to these events are uncommon.
The author herself explicitly denies most forms of political commentary others claim to have found in her work, stating once in an interview, "There is no political cause in my work."

On the contrary, Can Xue says she treats each story as a kind of life experiment in which she is the subject. “In very deep layers,” she says, “all of my works are autobiographical.” As for those who struggle to find meaning in her stories, Can Xue says, "If a reader feels that this book is unreadable, then it's quite clear that he's not one of my readers."

Can Xue has also written part of the libretto for at least one opera. In 2010, Can Xue and Lin Wang ( web) co-wrote the libretto for a contemporary chamber opera Die Quelle (The Source) commissioned to Lin Wang by Münchener Biennale. The opera is based on Can Xue's published short story ″the Double Life″. In this opera, a young artist named Jian Yi was deconstructed into different aspects played by different roles. They crosstalk to each other on stage; drying and bubbling-up of the spring symbolize loss and regain of one's own identity.  Lin Wang composed the music for Die Quelle (85' in length). Chinese instruments Sheng, Guzheng and Sanxian were used. An unusual feature is combination of English pronunciation and Chinese intonation in this opera. Die Quelle was premiered on May 9, 2010 in Munich Biennale and broadcast live.

Reception 
Amanda DeMarco stated that the extent to which Can Xue's work is radical is overstated. DeMarco also claims the animals in Frontier "appear in such wild profusion that it would be impossible to assign them a symbology. Can Xue’s writing is not metaphorical in this sense. There is no organized system of correspondence or meaning within it that would allow individual elements to be explained back into the realm of the logical. Often her works are compared to performances, to dance, or to visual art." However, the reviewer still described the experience of reading the author's books as rewarding, explaining that the tools of literature used in experimental writing to chart the human being extend beyond the capacities of language as logic. DeMarco said that at "the sentence level, [Frontier] is a wonderful, carefully hewn thing, lucid and pure".

American novelist and editor Bradford Morrow has described her as one of the most "innovative and important" authors in contemporary world literature.

Selected bibliography 
Can Xue has published a large number of novels, novellas, short stories, and book-length commentaries, many of which have been translated into English.

Novels

《突围表演》 (1988); later published as 五香街 (2002). Five Spice Street, trans. Karen Gernant and Chen Zeping (Yale, 2009).
 《最后的情人》 (2005). The Last Lover, trans. Annelise Finegan Wasmoen (Yale, 2014).
 《边疆》 (2008). Frontier, trans. Karen Gernant and Chen Zeping (Open Letter, 2017).
 《新世纪爱情故事》 (2013). Love in the New Millennium, trans. Annelise Finegan Wasmoen (Yale, 2018).
 《赤腳醫生》 (2019). Barefoot Doctor, trans. Karen Gernant and Chen Zeping (Yale, 2022).

Novellas

 《苍老的浮云》 (1986). Old Floating Cloud.
《黄泥街》 (1987). Yellow Mud Street.
《种在走廊上的苹果树》 (1987). Apple Tree in the Corridor.
《神秘列车之旅》 (published in 2016 in the collection of the same name). Mystery Train, trans. Natascha Bruce (Sublunary Editions, 2022).

Short story collections

 《天堂里的对话》 (1988). Dialogues in Paradise, trans. Ronald R. Janssen and Jian Zhang (Northwestern, 1989).

Compilations in English

 Old Floating Cloud: Two Novellas, trans. Ronald R. Janssen and Jian Zhang (Northwestern, 1991). Compiles Yellow Mud Street and Old Floating Cloud.
 The Embroidered Shoes, trans. Ronald R. Janssen and Jian Zhang (Henry Holt, 1997).
 Blue Light in the Sky and Other Stories, trans. Karen Gernant and Chen Zeping (New Directions, 2006).
 Vertical Motion, trans. Karen Gernant and Chen Zeping (Open Letter, 2011).
I Live in the Slums, trans. Karen Gernant and Chen Zeping (Yale, 2020).
 Purple Perilla, trans. Karen Gernant and Chen Zeping (ISOLARII, 2021). Compiles “An Affair”, “Mountain Ants” and “Purple Perilla”.

Awards and honors 

2015 Best Translated Book Award, winner, The Last Lover, translated from the Chinese by Annelise Finegan Wasmoen
2019: International Booker Prize, longlisted, Love in the New Millennium (新世纪爱情故事), translated from the Chinese by Annelise Finegan Wasmoen (Yale University Press)
2021: International Booker Prize, longlisted, I Live in the Slums, translated from Chinese by Karen Gernant & Chen Zeping (Yale University Press)

References

External links 
 MIT Contemporary Chinese Writers: Can Xue

Chinese literary critics
Writers from Changsha
1953 births
Living people
Chinese women short story writers
International Writing Program alumni
Chinese women novelists
People's Republic of China novelists
People's Republic of China short story writers
Short story writers from Hunan
20th-century pseudonymous writers
21st-century pseudonymous writers
Pseudonymous women writers